is a Japanese freestyle skier. She won a bronze medal at the 2014 Sochi Winter Olympics and the 2013 FIS Freestyle World Ski Championships.

References

External links
 
 
 
 

1988 births
Living people
Japanese female freestyle skiers
Freestyle skiers at the 2014 Winter Olympics
Freestyle skiers at the 2018 Winter Olympics
Olympic freestyle skiers of Japan
Olympic medalists in freestyle skiing
Olympic bronze medalists for Japan
Medalists at the 2014 Winter Olympics
X Games athletes
21st-century Japanese women